Mickey's Magical Party was a yearlong celebration during 2009 at Disneyland Paris.

Information
The celebration began on 4 April 2009. For the celebration new attractions and entertainment were brought to Disneyland Paris. Mickey's Magical Party ended in March 2010 and was replaced by Disney's New Generation Festival. It is a year-long event that is in celebration of Mickey Mouse's 80th anniversary that will feature new and old characters.

New for Mickey's Magical Party

New attractions
 Playhouse Disney Live On Stage!  (Walt Disney Studios Park)

New entertainment
 It's Party Time... with Mickey and Friends
 Minnie's Party Train
 It's Dance Time... In Discoveryland
 Disney Stars'n'Cars Parade (WDS)

Official links
Mickey's Magical Party official Website
Official Disneyland Resort Paris website

References

Mickey Mouse
Walt Disney Parks and Resorts
Disneyland Paris
Walt Disney Studios Park
2009 in France